Tim Wiese (born 17 December 1981) is a German former professional footballer who played as a goalkeeper.

Having progressed through the youth teams at DJK Dürscheid and Bayer Leverkusen, Wiese started his professional career at Fortuna Köln, and went on to play for 1. FC Kaiserslautern and Werder Bremen before signing for 1899 Hoffenheim in 2012.

Wiese made 13 appearances for the German under-21 squad between 2003 and 2005, before making his full international debut three years later against England. He went on to win five further caps and was part of the German 2010 FIFA World Cup squad, but did not make an appearance in that tournament.

Following Wiese's retirement from football in 2014, he gained a significant amount of muscle mass and was subsequently linked to a career in professional wrestling, eventually having a match in WWE in 2016.

Association football career

Club

Early career and Fortuna Köln
He started his playing career at DJK Dürscheid, in 1987. Two years later, he moved to Bayer Leverkusen's youth system, before moving to Fortuna Köln, where he made his first-team debut in the Regionalliga in 2000.

1. FC Kaiserslautern
He moved to Bundesliga side Kaiserslautern in the winter break of the 2001–02 season and initially played for their reserve squad in the third division and served as backup for Georg Koch and Roman Weidenfeller in the first team. Following Weidenfeller's transfer to Borussia Dortmund, he fought with Koch for the place of the first goalkeeper and made his Bundesliga debut at the beginning of the 2002–03 season, being replaced by Koch after conceding four goals in two matches. After the winter break, however, he managed to secure himself the position of the first-choice goalkeeper and established himself as one of the most talented new keepers in the Bundesliga. He was considered first-choice throughout the 2003–04 season, despite being sent off during the second match of the season (the first of two red cards he has received during his league career). He remained the first goalkeeper for Kaiserslautern until late November 2004, when he lost his place to veteran Thomas Ernst.

Werder Bremen

Wiese moved to Werder Bremen in 2005 and was favoured to replace the aging Andreas Reinke, but tore his cruciate ligaments twice and missed the entire first part of the season. Following Reinke sustaining an injury in a match against VfB Stuttgart in February 2006, Wiese made his Bundesliga debut for Werder Bremen, and remained their first goalkeeper for the rest of the 2005–06 season.

Wiese, however, (who is often compared to former German goalkeeper Oliver Kahn for his emotional outbursts) had a shaky start, with an error against Juventus in the second round of the UEFA Champions League on 7 March 2006 being of particular note. With only two minutes of the game left to play, and Bremen on course to reach the quarter-finals, he made a routine catch, but then dropped the ball as he rolled on the ground, allowing Emerson to score and Juventus to progress. He has stabilized since then, however, and was vital for Bremen's late surge that moved them past rivals Hamburger SV to claim second place during the 2005–06 season.

In the 2006–07 season, he eventually established himself as the first goalkeeper at Werder Bremen and only missed three Bundesliga matches throughout the season. In the 2008–09 DFB-Pokal semi-final against Hamburg, Wiese helped Werder Bremen progress to the final when he saved three consecutive penalties.

1899 Hoffenheim
On 2 May 2012, Wiese signed for 1899 Hoffenheim for an undisclosed fee, and was made club captain in August. A poor start to the season, however, saw Wiese conceding 15 goals in four games, resulting in Hoffenheim's manager Markus Babbel issuing a statement defending the goalkeeper. In November 2012, it was announced that Wiese had injured his knee in a training session and would be unavailable until January. Following the signing of Heurelho Gomes from Tottenham Hotspur on loan at the end of January 2013, Wiese was dropped from the squad, with Hoffenheim's manager Andreas Müller stating, "Tim doesn't have a chance in the current situation. No matter what he does, he doesn't have an opportunity to be assessed sensibly." Wiese and teammate Tobias Weis were fined an undisclosed amount following an incident at a carnival party on 11 February 2013, where the two players were ejected by security. In March 2013, Mueller announced that Wiese could leave the club on a free transfer if they were relegated, prompting several of his teammates to come to his defence, including Weis and team captain Sejad Salihović. During the season, Wiese made ten appearances for Hoffenheim, conceding 25 goals, with his last appearance coming in a 2–1 defeat against Eintracht Frankfurt on 26 January. Hoffenheim avoided relegation to the 2. Bundesliga, prompting further speculation about Wiese's future at the club.

His contract with Hoffenheim was mutually terminated on 21 January 2014, making him a free agent, after it was revealed that his body was in a bodybuilding style, unsuited to professional football.

International
Wiese earned his first international cap for Germany against England on 19 November 2008, when he came in as a substitute for René Adler at the beginning of the second half.

Wiese was a squad member for Germany in the 2010 FIFA World Cup, but was the only player not seeing any action as an understudy to Schalke 04 goalkeeper Manuel Neuer and was denied an appearance in the third-place playoff due to injury, enabling Bayern Munich veteran Hans-Jörg Butt to step in.

Retirement
Wiese announced his retirement from professional football on 17 September 2014, stating, "I am not a dreamer, but a realist and I assume that I have my best years behind me and I will no longer play as a professional."

In March 2017, Wiese returned to football for a one-off match with German eighth-division side SSV Dillingen of the Kreisliga Schwaben-Nord. Dillingen lost the match 2–1 to TSV Haunsheim on 1 April 2017.

Professional wrestling

In September 2014, Wiese claimed he had been offered a development contract by WWE to join their NXT division. He appeared as a guest timekeeper at a WWE live event in Frankfurt. On 7 June 2016, it was reported that Wiese accepted Triple H's invitation to train at WWE's developmental facility, the WWE Performance Center. Wiese made his professional wrestling debut at a WWE live event in Munich on 3 November 2016, teaming with Sheamus and Cesaro to defeat The Shining Stars and Bo Dallas. Wiese left the WWE in 2017.

Personal life
Wiese has been married to his longtime spouse Grit Freiberg since 20 December 2010, and has a daughter. He completed his Realschulabschluss at a comprehensive school in Kürten.

Career statistics

Club

International

Honours
Werder Bremen
DFB-Pokal: 2008–09
DFL-Ligapokal: 2006

Germany
FIFA World Cup third place: 2010

Individual
Silbernes Lorbeerblatt: 2010

References

External links

  
 
 
 
 Tim Wiese at werder.de 
 Cage Match profile

1981 births
Living people
People from Bergisch Gladbach
Sportspeople from Cologne (region)
German footballers
SC Fortuna Köln players
1. FC Kaiserslautern players
1. FC Kaiserslautern II players
SV Werder Bremen players
TSG 1899 Hoffenheim players
Bundesliga players
Germany under-21 international footballers
Germany international footballers
Association football goalkeepers
2010 FIFA World Cup players
UEFA Euro 2012 players
German male professional wrestlers
Footballers from North Rhine-Westphalia